WVRK (102.9 FM) is a radio station broadcasting a mainstream rock format. Licensed to Columbus, Georgia, United States, the station is owned by iHeartMedia, Inc. The station had previously been owned by M&M Partners Inc. and Cumulus Media before selling to Clear Channel (now iHeartMedia) in 2000.  Its studios are in Columbus east of downtown, and its transmitter is in Cusseta, Georgia, south of Fort Benning.

References

External links

VRK
Mainstream rock radio stations in the United States
Radio stations established in 1965
IHeartMedia radio stations